Amarpur is a village and municipality in Gulmi District in the Lumbini Zone of central Nepal. At the time of the 2011 Nepal census it had a population of 3598 people living in 840 individual households.

References

External links
UN map of the municipalities of Gulmi District
https://web.archive.org/web/20110225124847/http://kulgautam.org/2005/04/kul-chandra-gautam-biography/
https://sites.google.com/site/bgautam/village.html

Populated places in Gulmi District